Jonathan Williamson Rheault (born August 1, 1986) is an American professional ice hockey player who last played for the Nottingham Panthers in the Elite Ice Hockey League (EIHL). Rheault was born in Arlington, Texas, but grew up in Deering, New Hampshire.

Playing career
Raised in Deering, New Hampshire, Rheault attended Providence College from 2004 to 2008 and was selected by the Philadelphia Flyers in the 5th round (145th overall) of the 2006 NHL Entry Draft. Coming out of college, he played his first games as a professional hockey player with AHL's Manchester Monarchs. He also spent time with the Ontario Reign of the East Coast Hockey League and on June 16, 2010, he was signed as a free agent by the Abbotsford Heat. After two successful seasons with the Heat in the AHL, Rheault was signed to a one-year NHL contract with the Florida Panthers of the NHL on July 2, 2012.

With the 2012 NHL lockout in effect, Rheault was directly assigned to AHL affiliate, the San Antonio Rampage to begin the 2012–13 season. In producing 37 points through 50 games with the Rampage, Rheault received his first NHL recall by the Panthers on March 5, 2013. He made his long-awaited NHL debut that night, in a 4-1 home victory over the Winnipeg Jets.

On July 2, 2013, Rheault signed his first European contract with German club Adler Mannheim. During his three-year stint at Mannheim, he won the German championship in 2015. As a member of the Adler squad, he competed in the German top-flight Deutsche Eishockey Liga, the Champions Hockey League and the 2015 Spengler Cup.

Leaving Mannheim after three years, he moved to EHC Visp of the Swiss second-tier National League B (NLB) in May 2016. Following a season in Austria with EC KAC of the EBEL, Rheault continued his journeyman career in agreeing to a one-year contract with British club, Nottingham Panthers, of the EIHL on June 5, 2018.

Personal life
His sister, Jenna Rheault, currently plays ice hockey professionally for the Boston Pride in the NWHL.

Career statistics

Awards and honours

References

External links

1986 births
Living people
Abbotsford Heat players
Adler Mannheim players
American men's ice hockey right wingers
Florida Panthers players
Ice hockey people from New Hampshire
EC KAC players
Manchester Monarchs (AHL) players
Nottingham Panthers players
Ontario Reign (ECHL) players
People from Deering, New Hampshire
Philadelphia Flyers draft picks
Providence Bruins players
Providence Friars men's ice hockey players
San Antonio Rampage players
Ice hockey people from Texas
EHC Visp players